"Heaven Knows" is a song by Australian singer-songwriter Rick Price. The title track of his debut studio album Heaven Knows, it was released in July 1992 as the second single from the album, and peaked at No. 6 on the ARIA chart. It was certified gold. The song is also popular in Asia, particularly in island countries of the Philippines and Singapore.

At the APRA Music Awards of 1992, "Heaven Knows" won the award for 'song of the year'.

In February 2020, Price released a version of "Heaven Knows" as a duet with Filipino singer Morissette.

Track listing
CD single
 "Heaven Knows" – 4:25
 "Listen to Your Heart" – 3:48

CD maxi
 "Heaven Knows" – 4:25
 "Listen to Your Heart" – 3:48
 "Not a Day Goes By" (live acoustic version) –	3:32

Charts and accreditation

Weekly charts

Year-end charts

Certifications

External links
Discogs site

References

Rick Price songs
Songs written by Rick Price
1992 songs
1992 singles
APRA Award winners
Columbia Records singles
Epic Records singles
Pop ballads